Lieutenant-Colonel Sir Gilbert John Acland-Troyte,  (4 September 1876 – 27 April 1964) of Huntsham Court, near Tiverton, Devon, was a British soldier and Conservative Party politician.

Background
He was the third son of Colonel Charles Arthur William Troyte of Huntsham Court, by his wife Katherine Mary Walrond, daughter of Sir John Walrond, 1st Baronet of Bradfield House, Uffculme, Devon. Acland-Troyte was educated at Eton College and  Trinity College, Cambridge.

Career

Military
Acland-Troyte was commissioned as a 2nd Lieutenant in the 3rd Volunteer Battalion, Devonshire Regiment on 11 November 1896. He transferred to the regular army with appointment as second lieutenant in the 4th battalion, King's Royal Rifle Corps on 8 February 1899, and fought with his battalion in the Second Boer War one year later, where he was promoted to lieutenant on 25 January 1900, and was later dangerously wounded. He was with his regiment in Somaliland between 1903 and 1904 and was afterwards promoted to lieutenant. He rose to captain by 1905, for services to the Colonial Office.

During the First World War, Acland-Troyte was mentioned in despatches seven times. He was appointed Deputy Assistant Adjutant and Quartermaster-General in the beginning of 1915 and was promoted to major in September. In 1916 Acland-Troyte was decorated with the Distinguished Service Order and in 1917 was made a Companion of the Order of St Michael and St George (CMG). After the war he received the French Croix de Guerre in January 1919 and retired as brevet lieutenant-colonel a few months later. At the outbreak of the Second World War he was reactivated and in 1940 joined the Home Guard.

Political
Acland-Troyte contested unsuccessfully the parliamentary seat of Tiverton  in a by-election in 1923 and in the following general election. He was however successful the next year and was elected MP for Tiverton in 1924, which seat he held until  1945.

Retirement
Following his retirement from politics he was knighted and in 1946 accepted the office of Master of the Tiverton Foxhounds which he fulfilled until 1950. He was a  Justice of the Peace and alderman of Tiverton. In 1937 he was elected president of the Country Landowners Association, which post he left after two years.

Marriage
On 12 October 1909 he married Gwladys Eleanor Quicke (d.1968), daughter of Ernest Henry Godolphin Quicke of Newton House, Newton St Cyres, Devon.

Death
Acland-Troyte died in 1964, childless and was survived by his wife for four years. He is buried at All Saints' Church, Huntsham in Devon.

References

External links

1876 births
1964 deaths
Alumni of Trinity College, Cambridge
British Army personnel of the Second Boer War
British Army personnel of World War I
British military personnel of the Third Somaliland Expedition
Companions of the Distinguished Service Order
Companions of the Order of St Michael and St George
Conservative Party (UK) MPs for English constituencies
Recipients of the Croix de Guerre 1914–1918 (France)
King's Royal Rifle Corps officers
People educated at Eton College
UK MPs 1924–1929
UK MPs 1929–1931
UK MPs 1931–1935
UK MPs 1935–1945
Devonshire Regiment officers